Loud Luxury are a Canadian music production and DJ duo consisting of Andrew Fedyk and Joe Depace and currently based in Los Angeles. In 2017, they released a remix of the Martin Garrix and Dua Lipa single "Scared to Be Lonely", which gained them recognition.

History
The duo was formed when Fedyk and Depace, who met at University of Western Ontario, collaborated. Going to a Porter Robinson concert, they became inspired with the way Robinson had connected with the crowd. In December 2016, they released the song "See It Again".

In 2017, they remixed Martin Garrix and Dua Lipa's song "Scared to Be Lonely", which was included on the remix EP. They released an original single titled "Body" through Armin van Buuren's record label Armada Music. The song, which features vocalist Brando, debuted on the Billboard Hot Dance/Electronic Songs chart at number 49, selling 20,000 downloads and gaining over 40,000,000 streams. On February 17, 2017, Loud Luxury collaborated with deep house musician Ryan Shephard to release the song "Fill Me In" (initial title: "Something to Say") on Tiesto's record label AFTR:HRS.

In 2018, Loud Luxury received a nomination in the Independent Music Video category at the 9th Hollywood Music in Media Awards for "Show Me" featuring Nikki's Wives.

At the Juno Awards of 2019, they won the Juno Award for Dance Recording of the Year for "Body".

In 2019, Loud Luxury performed at EDC Las Vegas and Lollapalooza in Chicago.

Discography

Extended plays

Singles

Notes

Awards and nominations

References

External links
Bio on Armada Music
Bio on Insomniac

Deep house musicians
Canadian electronic music groups
Canadian DJs
Canadian musical duos
Armada Music artists
Musical groups established in 2012
Musical groups from London, Ontario
Electronic dance music duos
Juno Award for Dance Recording of the Year winners
Juno Award for Group of the Year winners
2012 establishments in Canada
Ableton Live users